Dewells "Dee" Barton Jr. (September 18, 1937 — December 3, 2001) was an American jazz trombonist, big band drummer, and prolific composer for big band and motion pictures. He is best known for his association with the Stan Kenton Orchestra.

Life

Early years 
Dee Barton was born in Houston, Mississippi in 1937. The family moved to Starkville, Mississippi in 1941.   His father became the band director at Starkville High School. "My dad brought home an old E flat mellophone and at the age of three I figured out the fingerings on it," said Barton.  Barton later took up the trombone.   He practiced in the school band room for 10 hours a day, and was able to help when his father was ill.  Barton was able to take over his father's work and teach all of his classes for two years to keep the Starkville High School job running.

Barton went onto attended Murray State University and after that North Texas State University where he was a member of the famed One O'Clock Lab Band under Gene Hall and Leon Breeden. In 1957 Barton already had a reputation and wanted to study composition at North Texas State University but had no money. Dr. Gene Hall, head of the department of music, arranged a full scholarship for Barton.

Professional work and Stan Kenton 

Barton early on had an ambition to join the Stan Kenton Orchestra. He first met Kenton backstage at a concert in 1953 when Barton was 15. "Stan was very strange in one sense," said Barton. "He never forgot the name of anybody I ever saw him meet. I didn't see him until two years later when I'd grown some. So I was surprised when he called me by name."

Determined then to get away from Mississippi, Barton went on the road in 1956 with Ralph Marterie's big band. "He was not a kind man, and it was a most unpleasant experience that almost turned me against the road altogether." He left the band in New York three weeks later and replaced an absent trombonist in the Maynard Ferguson Big Band. He also worked with the Charlie Spivak band during that time.

While Barton was attending school, Stan Kenton came to teach at a music clinic at North Texas State University in August 1959. Kenton became very familiar with Barton's playing and writing abilities.  In 1961, at the age of 23, Barton joined Kenton's orchestra in the trombone section. His compositions Waltz of the Prophets and Turtle Talk were recorded as part of Kenton's Grammy award-winning album Adventures in Jazz. He served on three other major Capitol releases in the trombone section.   Barton also acted as a substitute for Kenton's drummer on occasion and in June 1962 he gave up a trombone chair and became the band's drummer recording on Adventures in Time in September 1962, as well as four subsequent Kenton releases.  He eventually left the band in late 1963 to pursue a wider music career in Los Angeles. He returned for short tours in 1967 worked with Kenton as drummer and arranger on the album The World We Know and Finian's Rainbow (1968).  The highlight of Barton's tenure with Kenton came on the Capitol release Stan Kenton Conducts the Jazz Compositions of Dee Barton where he is showcased as both composer and drummer.

Clint Eastwood and Los Angeles 

Barton moved to Los Angeles and eventually wrote the scores for more than 50 Hollywood films.   In his spare time he ran a big band that played regularly at Donte's, a North Hollywood night-club. It was there Clint Eastwood heard Barton's music, eventually commissioning him to write the scores for the films Play Misty For Me (1971), High Plains Drifter (1973), Thunderbolt and Lightfoot (1974) and Every Which Way But Loose (1978). Barton also contributed to the writing for five other Eastwood films, including Dirty Harry (1971) and Magnum Force (1973).  Barton worked as a music consultant for Frank Sinatra, the Rolling Stones, Peggy Lee, Tony Bennett, John Lennon and others. He helped Jimmy Webb with the composition of MacArthur Park and later wrote an arrangement of the tune for Stan Kenton.

Back to the Mid-South: Memphis TN, Jackson MS 

In 1973 Barton moved to Memphis TN to become musical director for the William B. Tanner Company (recording studio, media, jingle writing). He worked there until 1988 when he left to work independently and teach seminars at schools. His 1996 album, The Dallas Jazz Orchestra Plays Dee Barton, was nominated for a Grammy. He continued for live music performances and in films mainly with London Symphony Orchestra and in Europe.

In 1998 Barton moved to Brandon, Mississippi and he became composer in residence at Jackson State University. "I teach orchestration, composition and advanced theory. Working with kids is what I really enjoy. They're hungry for somebody that has done it, rather than somebody that has gone to school all their life."

Personal life  

Barton's first marriage was to Jeri Catheryne Robinson. They had two sons, DeWells Barton III (b. 29 September 29, 1959, Collin County, Texas) and Shannon Barton (b. October 14, 1962, Los Angeles, California). He has three grandchildren, DeWells Barton III's children: Cole Barton (b. October 18, 1999 Los Angeles, California) and Haley Barton (b. February 1, 2002 Denton, Texas), and Shannon Barton's child: Jake Barton (b. 1997 Los Angeles, California) His second wife was Jane E. Earl (married August 15, 1965 Los Angeles – divorced, September 1969, Los Angeles). Dee's brother, William D. "Bill" Barton, was a trombonist, pianist, arranger and band leader. He died December 8, 2007.  Barton died in Brandon, Mississippi on December 3, 2001 at the age of 64.

Selected filmography 

Clint Eastwood
 Play Misty for Me (1971)
 High Plains Drifter (1973)
 Thunderbolt and Lightfoot (1974)

Other studios
 The Marshal of Windy Hollow (1972)

Earl Owensby Studios
 Death Screams (1982)
 Tales of the Third Dimension (1984)
 Chain Gang (1984)
 Unmasking the Idol (1986)
 The Order of the Black Eagle (1987)
 The Rutherford County Line (1987)

Selected Big Band Charts 

 "The Singing Oyster," ("The Gay One")
 "Turtle Talk"  ©1962 
 "Here's That Rainy Day" 
 "Waltz of the Prophets"  ©1962 
 "MacArthur Park, parts 1 & 2" 
 "Three thoughts" 
 "Woman" ("The muse")
 "New day" ("Elegy")
 "Dilemma" ("The Chez Rah")
 "Man"
 "Lonely boy"
 "My foolish heart"
 "Elegy" ("a new day")
 "Personal sounds part 1"
 "Personal sounds part 2"
 "Personal sounds part 3"
 "Personal sounds part 4"
 "Personal sounds part 5"
 "The snake" (unissued)
 "How are Things in Glocca Morra?"
 "Lullaby" from Rosemary's Baby
 "Modern man;" a concerto for orchestra,  ©1968
 "Stan Kenton prologue" ©1968
 "Dee Day" 1997

Selected discography 

As sideman (trombone)
 Ed Summerlin, Liturgical Jazz Ecclesia (1959) 
 One O'Clock Lab Band, University of North Texas College of Music, 90th Floor Records, Dallas (1961) 
 Don Jacoby and the College All-Stars, Swinging Big Sound
 Recorded in Chicago, October 1961, Decca Records 

As trombonist with Stan Kenton
 Horns of Plenty, Volume 2 (2-CD set, 1st CD is Kenton; 2nd CD is the One O'Clock Lab Band), Tantara Records (2000) 
 1st CD recorded in Cincinnati, Ohio, June 16 & 17; and Santa Barbara, California, December 8, 1961

 One Night Stand 5491 
 Recorded at the Marine Ballroom, Steel Pier, Atlantic City, New Jersey, September 2–4, 1961

 Stan Kenton And His Orchestra
 Recorded at the Manhattan Center, New York City, 1 to 4 PM, September 26, 1961 
 "Waltz of the prophets," arranged by Barton

 Adventures in Standards, Creative World 
 Recorded in Hollywood, California, December 5, 6 and 7, 1961

 Adventures In Jazz, Creative World 
 Recorded in Hollywood, California, December 11 & 12, 13, and 14, 1961
 "Waltz of the prophets," arranged by Barton (recorded December 12 and 14, 1961)
 U.A. Air Force Reserve Radio Transcriptions: "Sound '62" Radio transcriptions, Hollywood, CA, December 15 & 16, 1961
 "Waltz of the prophets" (performed)

 Mellophonium Moods 1962, 
 Broadcast, Patio Gardens Ballroom, New Lagoon, Salt Lake City, Utah, March 1962

 Stan Kenton! Tex Ritter!, Capitol Records (1962)
 Recorded in Hollywood, California, March 26, 29, and 30

 Stan Kenton And His Orchestra, Introducing Jean Turner Recorded in Hollywood, California, 8 to 11 PM, April 3, 1962
 Private Recording, Bascom, Ohio, April 23, 1962
 "Waltz of the prophets" (recorded April 23, 1962)

 The Sound Of Sixty-two 
 Live performance, Holiday Ballroom, Northbrook, Chicago, May 6, 1962
 "Waltz of the Prophets" (performed)

As drummer with Stan Kenton

 Horns Of Plenty, Volume 3 
 Recorded in Westbury, New York, July 2, 1962
 "Waltz of the Prophets" (performed)

 One Night Stand 5707 
 Marine Ballroom, Steel Pier, Atlantic City, New Jersey, July 19, 1962

 Stan Kenton And His Orchestra Broadcasts, WNEW Radio Studios, New York, afternoon, July 28, 1962

 Live from Freedomland, The Bronx, New York, 8 pm, July 28, 1962 
 "Waltz of the Prophets" (performed)

 More Mellophonium Moods 
 Live, Patio Gardens Ballroom, The Lagoon, Salt Lake City, August 24, 1962

 Adventures in Time, Capitol Records (1963) 
 Recorded in Hollywood, California, September 24, 25, 27, and 28, 1962

 Artistry in Bossa Nova 
 Recorded in Hollywood, California, April 16, 17, 1963

 Artistry in Voices and Brass Capitol Records (1964) 
 Recorded in Hollywood, California, April 19, 1963, and September 10, 1963

 The Best of Brant Inn 
 Broadcast, Brant Inn, Burlington, Ontario, Canada, June 12, 1963
 "Waltz of the Prophets" (performed)

 Live at Newport 
 Live Newport Jazz Festival, Newport, Rhode Island, July 4, 1963
 "Waltz of the Prophets" (performed)

 Stan Kenton And His Orchestra Recorded in Hollywood, California, September 10, 1963

 Stan Kenton / Jean Turner 
 Recorded in Hollywood, California, September 11 & 12, 1963

 Kenton In England 
 Recorded at Free Trade Hall, Manchester, England, November 23, 1963
 "Waltz of the Prophets" (performed)

 Kenton — Road Band '67 
 Recorded at Moonlight Gardens, Coney Island Park, Cincinnati, Ohio, June 9 & 10, 1967
 "Here's That Rainy Day," arranged by Barton
 "Three thoughts," arranged by Barton
 "The Singing Oyster," arranged by BartonThe World We Know (Capitol, 1967)
 Recorded in Hollywood, California, 2–5 PM, October 2, 1967; and 2—5 PM & 6—9 PM, October 3, 1967; 2—6:30 PM), October 4, 1967

 The Jazz Compositions of Dee Barton, Capitol Records 
 Recorded in Hollywood, California, December 19 & 20, 1967
 "The singing oyster" ("The gay one")
 "Three thoughts"
 "Woman" ("The muse")
 "New day" ("Elegy")
 "Dilemma" ("The Chez Rah")
 "Man"
 "Lonely boy"

 Stan Kenton at Fountain Street Church — Part One 
 Recorded in Grand Rapids, Michigan, March 31, 1968
 "Here's That Rainy Day" (performed)
 "Three thoughts" (performed)
 "Woman" ("The Muse") (performed)

 Stan Kenton At Fountain Street Church — Part Two Recorded in Grand Rapids, Michigan, March 31, 1968
 "My foolish heart," arranged by Barton
 "Elegy" ("A New Day") (performed)

 Stan Kenton, Capitol Records (unissued)
 Recorded in Hollywood, California, 11AM – 2PM, 2:45 – 5:45 PM, May 7, 1968
 "Personal sounds part 1," arranged by Barton
 "Personal sounds part 2," arranged by Barton
 "Personal sounds part 3," arranged by Barton
 "Personal sounds part 4," arranged by Barton
 "Personal sounds part 5," arranged by Barton

 Stan Kenton And His Orchestra, Capitol Records
 Recorded in Hollywood, California, July 15 3 — 6 PM, 1968
 "MacArthur Park, parts 1 & 2," arranged by Barton
 "The snake," arranged by Barton (unissued)Finian's Rainbow (Capitol, 1968) 
 Recorded in Hollywood, California, 3—6 PM, July 16, 1968; 3—6 PM, July 17, 1968; 3—7 PM, July 18, 1968
 "How are Things in Glocca Morra?," arranged by Barton
 "Lullaby" from Rosemary's Baby, arranged by Barton

Soley as arranger for Stan Kenton

 Live At Redlands University 
 Live at Memorial Chapel, Redlands University, Redlands, California, August 3, 4, 5, 1970
 "MacArthur Park" (performed August 3, 1970)
 "Here's That Rainy Day" (performed August 5, 1970)

As arranger
 Pete Jolly, Give a Damn, A&M Records (1969) 
 Live Donte's, North Hollywood, c. 1969
 Brass arrangements by Barton

 Mark Masters' Jazz Composers Orchestra, Early Start 
 Recorded in Hollywood, California, January 17 and March 27, 1984
 "Turtle talk" (performed)

 Chicago Metropolitan Jazz Orchestra, Live And Screamin''', Chicago Lakeside Jazz (1998) 
 Recorded live at FitzGerald's Night Club, Chicago, Illinois, November 1997
 "Here's that rainy day" (performed)

External links 

  Read interview with Dee Barton and complete biography, see photos, and hear music written by him at http://mswritersandmusicians.com/musicians/dee-barton.html
 Obituary

References 

1937 births
2001 deaths
American film score composers
American male film score composers
Murray State University alumni
University of North Texas College of Music alumni
People from Houston, Mississippi
20th-century American composers
20th-century American male musicians